Dayman is a surname. Notable people with the surname include:

Edward Dayman (1807–1890), English clergyman and hymn writer
Greg Dayman (born 1947), New Zealand field hockey player
Ivan Dayman, Australian record producer and band manager
Les Dayman (1901–?), Australian rules footballer
Leslie Dayman (born 1933), Australian actor